The 1988 US Open was a tennis tournament played on outdoor hard courts at the USTA National Tennis Center in New York City, United States. It was the 108th edition of the US Open and was held from August 29 to September 11, 1988.

Seniors

Men's singles

 Mats Wilander defeated  Ivan Lendl 6–4, 4–6, 6–3, 5–7, 6–4
 It was Wilander's 7th and last career Grand Slam title and his only US Open title. He became the first male player since Jimmy Connors in 1974 to win three Grand Slam titles in a season.  The final was the longest in the Open's history, lasting 4 hours and 55 minutes

Women's singles

 Steffi Graf defeated  Gabriela Sabatini 6–3, 3–6, 6–1
 It was Graf's 5th career Grand Slam title and her 1st US Open title. She became the second woman in the Open Era to complete a singles Grand Slam in a calendar year after Margaret Court did so in 1970. After winning the Olympic title in Seoul weeks later, she became the first (and so far only) man or woman to win a calendar year Golden Slam.

Men's doubles

 Sergio Casal /  Emilio Sánchez defeated  Rick Leach /  Jim Pugh by walkover
 It was Casal's 2nd career Grand Slam title and his 2nd and last US Open title. It was Sánchez's 4th career Grand Slam title and his 2nd and last US Open title.

Women's doubles

 Gigi Fernández /  Robin White defeated  Patty Fendick /  Jill Hetherington 6–4, 6–1
 It was the 1st career Grand Slam title and 1st US Open title for both Fernández and White.

Mixed doubles

 Jana Novotná /  Jim Pugh defeated  Elizabeth Smylie /  Patrick McEnroe 7–5, 6–3
 It was Novotná's 2nd career Grand Slam title and her 1st US Open title. It was Pugh's 3rd career Grand Slam title and his only US Open title.

Juniors

Boys' singles

 Nicolás Pereira defeated  Nicklas Kulti 6–1, 6–2

Girls' singles

 Carrie Cunningham defeated  Rachel McQuillan 7–5, 6–3

Boys' doubles

 Jonathan Stark /  John Yancey defeated  Massimo Boscatto /  Stefano Pescosolido 7–6, 7–5

Girls' doubles

 Meredith McGrath /  Kimberly Po defeated  Cathy Caverzasio /  Laura Lapi 6–3, 6–1

Notes

External links
 Official US Open website

 
 

 
US Open
US Open (tennis) by year
US Open
US Open
US Open
US Open